Chaetosphaeria is a genus of fungi in the family Chaetosphaeriaceae.

Species

Chaetosphaeria abietis
Chaetosphaeria acutata
Chaetosphaeria africana
Chaetosphaeria albida
Chaetosphaeria alboferruginea
Chaetosphaeria ampulliformis
Chaetosphaeria angelicae
Chaetosphaeria anglica
Chaetosphaeria arecacensis
Chaetosphaeria aspergilloides
Chaetosphaeria aterrima
Chaetosphaeria atriella
Chaetosphaeria atrobarba
Chaetosphaeria barbicincta
Chaetosphaeria bicellula
Chaetosphaeria bihyalina
Chaetosphaeria bombycina
Chaetosphaeria bramleyi
Chaetosphaeria brasiliensis
Chaetosphaeria brevicollis
Chaetosphaeria brevispinosa
Chaetosphaeria brevispora
Chaetosphaeria bromeliae
Chaetosphaeria caelestina
Chaetosphaeria caespitulosa
Chaetosphaeria callimorpha
Chaetosphaeria capitata
Chaetosphaeria castaneoviolacea
Chaetosphaeria chaetosa
Chaetosphaeria chalaroides
Chaetosphaeria chloroconia
Chaetosphaeria chlorotunicata
Chaetosphaeria ciliata
Chaetosphaeria coelestina
Chaetosphaeria coelestinoides
Chaetosphaeria coffeae
Chaetosphaeria conirostris
Chaetosphaeria crepinii
Chaetosphaeria crustacea
Chaetosphaeria cubensis
Chaetosphaeria cupulifera
Chaetosphaeria curvispora
Chaetosphaeria cylindrospora
Chaetosphaeria decastyla
Chaetosphaeria dickasonii
Chaetosphaeria dilabens
Chaetosphaeria dingleyae
Chaetosphaeria elegans
Chaetosphaeria ellisii
Chaetosphaeria endophytica
Chaetosphaeria eximia
Chaetosphaeria exserticlavoides
Chaetosphaeria falacrospora
Chaetosphaeria fennica
Chaetosphaeria flavocompta
Chaetosphaeria fuegiana
Chaetosphaeria fusca
Chaetosphaeria fusichalaroides
Chaetosphaeria fusiformis
Chaetosphaeria gallica
Chaetosphaeria hainanensis
Chaetosphaeria hebetiseta
Chaetosphaeria helicteris
Chaetosphaeria hinoi
Chaetosphaeria hispida
Chaetosphaeria hiugensis
Chaetosphaeria holophaea
Chaetosphaeria hongkongensis
Chaetosphaeria inaequalis
Chaetosphaeria incrustans
Chaetosphaeria indica
Chaetosphaeria innumera
Chaetosphaeria insectivora
Chaetosphaeria iquitosensis
Chaetosphaeria lapaziana
Chaetosphaeria latericolla
Chaetosphaeria lateriphiala
Chaetosphaeria latitans
Chaetosphaeria lentomita
Chaetosphaeria leonina
Chaetosphaeria lignicola
Chaetosphaeria lignomollis
Chaetosphaeria longipila
Chaetosphaeria longiseta
Chaetosphaeria ludens
Chaetosphaeria luquillensis
Chaetosphaeria macrospora
Chaetosphaeria meliolicola
Chaetosphaeria metallicans
Chaetosphaeria millingtoniae
Chaetosphaeria minuta
Chaetosphaeria montana
Chaetosphaeria multiseptata
Chaetosphaeria myriadea
Chaetosphaeria myriocarpa
Chaetosphaeria nagatensis
Chaetosphaeria novae-zelandiae
Chaetosphaeria ornata
Chaetosphaeria ovoidea
Chaetosphaeria panamensis
Chaetosphaeria pannicola
Chaetosphaeria parvicapsa
Chaetosphaeria parvula
Chaetosphaeria patelliformis
Chaetosphaeria perforata
Chaetosphaeria peziziformis
Chaetosphaeria phaeostalacta
Chaetosphaeria pileoferruginea
Chaetosphaeria poonensis
Chaetosphaeria potentillae
Chaetosphaeria preussii
Chaetosphaeria puiggarii
Chaetosphaeria pulchriseta
Chaetosphaeria pulviscula
Chaetosphaeria pusilla
Chaetosphaeria pygmaea
Chaetosphaeria raciborskii
Chaetosphaeria rajasthanensis
Chaetosphaeria rubicunda
Chaetosphaeria rubiginosa
Chaetosphaeria saccardoana
Chaetosphaeria saltuensis
Chaetosphaeria silva-nigra
Chaetosphaeria squamulata
Chaetosphaeria stenostachyae
Chaetosphaeria subcaespitosa
Chaetosphaeria sylvatica
Chaetosphaeria talbotii
Chaetosphaeria thalictri
Chaetosphaeria togniniana
Chaetosphaeria tortuosa
Chaetosphaeria trianguloconidia
Chaetosphaeria tristis
Chaetosphaeria tropicalis
Chaetosphaeria tubulicollaris
Chaetosphaeria vermicularioides
Chaetosphaeria verruculospora
Chaetosphaeria xanthotricha
Chaetosphaeria yosie-hidakae

References

External links

Sordariomycetes genera
Chaetosphaeriales